The 2015 Chicago aldermanic elections happened on February 24, 2015, to elect the 50 Aldermen that represent Chicago in the City Council. The elections were non-partisan and if no candidate received an absolute majority, a runoff would be held between the top two finishers on April 7, 2015.

Ward boundaries had been redrawn since the previous 2011 election, to reflect the results of the 2010 United States Census. The new ward map had been approved by the Chicago City Council in January 2012.

Overview

Campaign 
43 incumbent alderman sought re-election. Aldermen Edward M. Burke (14th Ward), Marty Quinn (13th Ward), Brendan Reilly (42nd Ward) and Harry Osterman (48th Ward) all ran unopposed in this election. Aldermen Toni Foulkes (15th Ward) and Nicholas Sposato (36th Ward) ran in different wards than those they had been incumbents of: the 16th and 38th, respectively. Incumbent aldermen Robert Fioretti (2nd Ward), James Balcer (11th Ward), Latasha Thomas (17th Ward) and Timothy Cullerton (38th Ward) did not run for re-election.

In the first round, two candidates who ran for re-election lost their seats, including Joann Thompson (who died in office, but remained on the ballot). There were runoffs in 18 wards. Six additional incumbent alderman were defeated in runoffs.'

Seat changes

Election calendar

North Side

1st Ward
Incumbent alderman Proco Joe Moreno was reelected. Moreno had been appointed alderman in 2010 by Mayor Richard M. Daley, and had subsequently been reelected in 2011.

Candidates

One candidate was removed from the ballot due to insufficient nominating petition signatures:
Mia Lena Lopez

Endorsements

Results

2nd Ward
Incumbent second-term alderman Bob Fioretti did not seek reelection, instead, opting to run (unsuccessfully) for mayor. Brian Hopkins was elected to succeed him, defeating  Alyx Pattison in a runoff.

Candidates

Endorsements

Results

32nd Ward
Incumbent second-term alderman Scott Waguespack was reelected, defeating Elise Doody-Jones, his sole challenger.

Candidates

Endorsements

Results

40th Ward
Incumbent eighth-term alderman Patrick J. O'Connor was reelected, defeating Dianne Daleiden, his sole challenger.

Candidates

Endorsements

Results

42nd Ward
Incumbent second-term alderman Brendan Reilly was reelected, running unopposed.

Candidates

Results

43rd Ward
Incumbent first-term alderman Michelle Smith was reelected, defeating Caroline Vickrey in a runoff by a narrow 79 vote margin (equal to 0.54% of the votes cast in the runoff).

Candidates

One write-in candidate filed:
 Steven McClellan

One candidate was removed from the ballot due to insufficient nominating petition signatures:
 Steven McClellan subsequently ran as a write-in

The following candidate filed nominating petitions but withdrew before ballot certification:
 Andrew Challenger

Endorsements

Results

44th Ward
Incumbent third-term alderman Tom Tunney was reelected.

Candidates

One write-in candidate filed:
 Robin Cook

Endorsements

Results

46th Ward
Incumbent first-term alderman James Cappleman was reelected, defeating Amy Crawford in a runoff.

Candidates

Endorsements

Results

47th Ward
Incumbent first-term alderman Ameya Pawar was reelected, defeating Rory Fiedler, his sole challenger.

Candidates

Endorsements

Results

48th Ward
Incumbent first-term alderman Harry Osterman was reelected, running unopposed.

Candidates

Results

49th Ward
Incumbent sixth-term alderman Joe Moore was reelected, defeating Don Gordon, his sole challenger.

Candidates

Four candidates were removed from the ballot due to insufficient nominating petition signatures or other reasons:
John Beacham
Connie Gates-Brown
Grady A. Humphrey
Nathan Benjamin "Ben" Myers

Endorsements

Results

50th Ward
Incumbent first-term alderman Debra Silverstein was reelected.

Candidates

Two write-in candidates filed:
 Hilaire Fuji Shioura
 Peter Sifnotis

Two candidates were removed from the ballot due to insufficient nominating petition signatures:
 Hilaire Fuji Shioura subsequently ran as a write-in
 Peter George Sifnotis subsequently ran as a write-in

Endorsements

Results

Northwest Side

26th Ward
Incumbent alderman Roberto Maldonado was reelected. Maldonado had been first appointed by Mayor Richard M. Daley in 2009, and had been subsequently reelected in 2011.

Candidates

Endorsements

Results

30th Ward
Incumbent third-term alderman Ariel Reboyras was reelected, running unopposed on the ballot, facing only a write-in opponent.

Candidates

One write-in candidate filed:
 Edgar Esparza

One candidate was removed from the ballot due to insufficient nominating petition signatures:
 Edgar Espparza subsequently ran as a write-in

The following candidate filed nominating petitions but withdrew before ballot certification:
 Walter Zarnecki

Results

31st Ward
Incumbent sixth-term alderman Ray Suarez unsuccessfully sought reelection. He was defeated in a runoff by Milly Santiago.

Candidates

Endorsements

Results

33rd Ward
Incumbent alderman Deb Mell was reelected to a first full term. Mell had been appointed by Mayor Rahm Emanuel in 2013.

Candidates

One candidate was removed from the ballot due to insufficient nominating petition signatures:
 Tyler Solario

Endorsements

Results

35th Ward
Incumbent third-term alderman Rey Colón unsuccessfully sought reelection. He was defeated by Carlos Ramirez-Rosa, his sole challenger.

Candidates

Endorsements

Results

36th Ward
Incumbent Nicholas Sposato ran in the adjacent 38th Ward due to redistricting. Gilbert Villegas was elected to succeed him as 36th Ward alderman, defeating Omar Aquino in a runoff.

Candidates

One candidate was removed from the ballot due to insufficient nominating petition signatures:
 Joaquin Vazquez

Endorsements
First round

Runoff

Results

38th Ward
Incumbent Timothy Cullerton did not run for reelection. Cullerton had been first appointed by Mayor Richard M. Daley in 2011, and had been elected outright to a full term in the 2011 aldermanic elections shortly thereafter. Redistricted 36th Ward incumbent Nicholas Sposato was elected to succeed Cullerton as 38th Ward alderman.

Candidates

Two candidates were removed from the ballot due to insufficient nominating petition signatures or other reasons:
 John J. Cianci
 Mike Keeney

Endorsements

Results

39th Ward
Incumbent alderman Margaret Laurino was reelected. Laurino had first been appointed by Mayor Richard M. Daley in 1994, and had been reelected five times before.

Candidates

One candidate was removed from the ballot due to insufficient nominating petition signatures:
 Joaquin Vazquez

Endorsements

Results

41st Ward
Incumbent first-term alderman Mary O'Connor ran unsuccessfully for reelection, being defeated by Anthony Napolitano in a runoff.

Candidates

Endorsements
First round

Runoff

Results

45th Ward
Incumbent first-term alderman John Arena was reelected, defeating John Garrido in a runoff.

Candidates

Endorsements

Results

West Side

22nd Ward
Incumbent alderman Ricardo Muñoz was reelected. Muñoz had first been appointed by Mayor Richard M. Daley in 1993, and had been reelected five times before.

Candidates

One write-in candidate filed:
 Alex Velazquez

One candidate was removed from the ballot due to insufficient nominating petition signatures:
 Alex Velazquez subsequently ran as a write-in

Endorsements

Results

24th Ward
Incumbent alderman Michael Chandler did not run for reelection. Michael Scott Jr. was elected to succeed him, defeating Vetress Boyce in a runoff.

Candidates

One write-in candidate filed:
 Catrina Singletary-Edwards

One candidate was removed from the ballot due to insufficient nominating petition signatures or other reasons:
 Denarvis Mendenhall

The following candidates filed nominating petitions but withdrew before ballot certification:
 Andre Holland
 Vernell L. Hollis-Swanigan
 Marcus D. Thorne

Endorsements

Results

25th Ward
Incumbent alderman Daniel Solis was reelected. Solis had first been appointed by Mayor Richard M. Daley in 1996, and had been reelected four times before.

Candidates

The following candidate filed nominating petitions but withdrew before ballot certification:
 Troy Hernandez subsequently ran as a write-in

Endorsements

Results

27th Ward
Incumbent fifth-term alderman Walter Burnett Jr. was reelected, defeating Gabe Beukinga, his sole challenger.

Incumbent alderman Daniel Solis was reelected. Solis had first been appointed by Mayor Richard M. Daley in 1996, and had been reelected four times before.

Candidates

Endorsements

Results

28th Ward
Incumbent first-term alderman Jason Ervin was reelected, running unopposed on the ballot, facing only a write-in opponent.

Candidates

One write-in candidate filed:
 Willie McGill

Six candidates were removed from the ballot due to insufficient nominating petition signatures or other reasons:
Jasmine Jackson
Alex M. Lyons
Willie McGill subsequently ran as a write-in
William Siegmund
Elliot Thomas
Tammie Vinson

The following candidate filed nominating petitions but withdrew before ballot certification:
Marseil Jackson

Endorsements

Results

29th Ward
Incumbent alderman Deborah L. Graham unsuccessfully sought reelection. Graham had first been appointed by Mayor Richard M. Daley in 2010, and had been reelected in 2011. She was defeated by Chris Taliaferro in a runoff.

Candidates

The following candidates filed nominating petitions but withdrew before ballot certification:
 Lisa Jackson
 Maurice J. Robinson
 Brenda Smith
 Deborah D. Williams

Endorsements
First round

Runoff

Results

37th Ward
Incumbent alderman Emma Mitts was reelected. Mitts had first been appointed by Mayor Richard M. Daley in 2000, and had subsequently been reelected in 2003, 2007, and 2011. She defeated Tara Stamps in a runoff.

Candidates

One candidate was removed from the ballot:
 Otis Percy

Endorsements

Results

Southwest Side

11th Ward
Incumbent alderman James Balcer did not run for reelection. Balcer had first been appointed by Mayor Richard M. Daley in 1997, and had been reelected four times. Patrick Daley Thompson was elected to succeed him, defeating John Kozlar in a runoff.

Candidates

Endorsements

Results

12th Ward
Incumbent third-term alderman George Cardenas was reelected, running unopposed on the ballot, with only a write-in opponent.

Candidates

One write-in candidate filed:
 Peter John DeMay

One candidate was removed from the ballot due to insufficient nominating petition signatures:
 Peter John DeMay subsequently ran as a write-in

Results

13th Ward
Incumbent first-term alderman Marty Quinn was reelected, running unopposed.

Candidates

Results

14th Ward
Incumbent alderman Edward M. Burke was reelected, running unopposed. The longest-serving member of the Chicago City Council, Burke had consecutively served eleven full terms, plus a partial term.

Candidates

Results

15th Ward
Incumbent two-term alderman Toni Foulkes ran in the adjacent 16th ward due to redistricting. Raymond Lopez was elected to succeed her as 15th Ward alderman, defeating Rafael Yanez in a runoff.

Candidates

Endorsements
First round

Runoff

Results

16th Ward
Incumbent alderman JoAnn Thompson sought reelection. She was challenged by redistricted incumbent two-term 15th Ward alderman Toni Foulkes and several other candidates. Thompson ultimately died two weeks before the general election. Foulkes advanced to a runoff, in which she narrowly defeated Stephanie Coleman.

Candidates

Two candidates were removed from the ballot due to insufficient nominating petition signatures:
 Jeffrey L. Lewis
 Guadalupe Rivera

Endorsements

Results

17th Ward
Incumbent Latasha Thomas did not run for reelection. Thomas had first been appointed by Mayor Richard M. Daley in 2000, and was elected outright in a 2001 special election, later being thrice reelected. David H. Moore was elected to succeed her.

Candidates

Endorsements

Results

18th Ward
Incumbent alderman Lona Lane unsuccessfully sought reelection. Lane had first been appointed by Mayor Richard M. Daley, and had been reelected in 2007 and 2011. She was defeated by Derrick Curtis in a runoff.

Candidates

Two candidates were removed from the ballot due to insufficient nominating petition signatures:
 Shaakira Ali
 Howard Lindsey

Endorsements
First round

Runoff

Results

23rd Ward
Incumbent fifth-term alderman Michael R. Zalewski was reelected.

Candidates

Two candidates were removed from the ballot due to insufficient nominating petition signatures:
 Charles M. Hughes
 Paulino R. Villarreal, Jr.

Endorsements

Results

South Side

3rd Ward
Incumbent second-term alderman Pat Dowell was reelected, defeating Patricia Horton, her sole challenger.

Candidates

One candidate was removed from the ballot due to insufficient nominating petition signatures:
 Clarence D. Clemons

Endorsements

Results

4th Ward
Incumbent first-term alderman William D. Burns was reelected.

Candidates

One candidate was removed from the ballot due to insufficient nominating petition signatures:
 Jeffrey Booker

Endorsements

Results

5th Ward
Incumbent fourth-term alderman Leslie Hairston was reelected.

Candidates

One write-in candidate filed:
 Loretta Lomax

One candidate was removed from the ballot due to insufficient nominating petition signatures:
 Loretta Lomax subsequently ran as write-in

Endorsements

Results

6th Ward
Incumbent first-term alderman Roderick Sawyer was reelected.

Candidates

Two write-in candidates filed:
 Susan Davis
 Delton Jerry Pierce

One candidate was removed from the ballot due to insufficient nominating petition signatures:
 Delton Jerry Pierce subsequently filed as a write-in

The following candidate filed nominating petitions but withdrew before ballot certification:
 Dumars Ervin Franklin

Endorsements

Results

7th Ward
Incumbent alderman Natashia Holmes unsuccessfully sought reelection. Holmes had been appointed by Mayor Rahm Emanuel in 2013. She was defeated by Gregory Mitchell in a runoff.

Candidates

Two write-in candidates filed:
Jesse L. Harley
Chevette A. Valentine

One candidate was removed from the ballot due to insufficient nominating petition signatures:
 Lynn Renee Franco

Endorsements
First round

Runoff

Results

8th Ward
Incumbent alderman Michelle A. Harris was reelected. Harris had been first appointed by Mayor Richard M. Daley in 2006, and had been reelected in 2007 and 2011.

Candidates

Endorsements

Results

20th Ward
Second-term incumbent alderman Willie Cochran was reelected, defeating Kevin Bailey in a runoff.

Candidates

One write-in candidate filed:
 Jerome Davis

Two candidates were removed from the ballot due to insufficient nominating petition signatures:
 Jerome A. Davis subsequently ran as write-in
 Ronnie D. Nelson

Endorsements

Results

Far South Side

9th Ward
Incumbent fourth-term alderman Anthony Beale was reelected.

Candidates

One write-in candidate filed:
 Agin Muhammad

Two candidates were removed from the ballot due to insufficient nominating petition signatures:
 Curtiss Llong Bey
 Agin Muhammad II subsequently ran as write-in

Endorsements

Results

10th Ward
Incumbent fourth-term alderman John Pope unsuccessfully sought reelection. He was defeated by Susan Sadlowski Garza in a runoff by a narrow 20-vote margin (equal to 0.18% of the votes cast in a runoff).

Candidates

One write-in candidate filed:
 Albert Valentine

Endorsements

Results

As of April 21, Alderman Pope had filed suit for a recount.  On May 12, however, Pope conceded defeat to Garza.

19th Ward
Incumbent first-term alderman Matt O'Shea was reelected, defeating Anne Schaible, his sole challenger on the ballot.

Candidates

One write-in candidate filed:
 Joann Breivogei

Endorsements

Results

21st Ward
Incumbent third-term alderman Howard Brookins was reelected, defeating Marvin McNeil in a runoff.

Candidates

One candidate was removed from the ballot due to insufficient nominating petition signatures:
CM Winters

Endorsements
First round

Runoff
First round

Results

34th Ward
Incumbent alderman Carrie Austin was reelected. Austin had first been appointed alderman by Mayor Richard M. Daley in 1994, and had subsequently been reelected to five consecutive subsequent terms before this.

Candidates

Endorsements

Results

See also
 Chicago mayoral election, 2015
 United States elections, 2015

Notes
A.

References

External links
https://web.archive.org/web/20141204150503/http://app.chicagoelections.com/documents/general/M2015-CandidateFiling-2014-11-17-1415.pdf

Chicago City Council
2015
Chicago City Council